Paul Leslie Redfearn Jr. (1926–2018) was an American professor of botany, specializing in mosses and liverworts. He was the president of the American Bryological and Lichenological Society from 1971 to 1973. He was the mayor of Springfield, Missouri from 1978 to 1981.

Biography
After graduating from high school, Paul L. Redfearn Jr. served in the United States Army Air Corps in 1944 and 1945. He graduated in 1948 with B.S. from Florida Southern College and in 1949 with M.S. from the University of Tennessee. From 1950 to 1954 he served in the United States Army Medical Service Corps in California and Japan. He graduated from Florida State University with Ph.D. in 1957. He taught botany in the department of biology at Missouri State University from 1957 to 1988, when he retired as professor emeritus. In Springfield, Missouri, Redfearn served from 1973 to 1977 as a city council member in Zone 4 and from 1978 to 1981 as the mayor. (Springfield has council-manager government and Springfield's City Council has 4 Zones: numbered 1 for NW, 2 for NE, 3 for SW, 4 for SE. National Avenue in Zone 4 forms the eastern boundary of Missouri State University.)

Redfearn received several awards. In 1965 he was elected a Fellow of the American Association for the Advancement of Science. He was a member of many organizations and served as a volunteer curator at the Norland Henderson Herbarium of Powell Gardens in Kingsville, Missouri. Redfearn was from 1986 to 1992 the editor-in-chief of the journal Missouriensis of the Missouri Native Plants Society.

In 1949 in Polk County, Florida, Paul Redfearn Jr. married Donna Alice Rubie Whitten. Upon his death he was survived by his widow, two sons, Paul Leslie III and James Jeffrey, two granddaughters, one step-grandson, and five great grandchildren. Paul L. Redfearn III became a lawyer with a national reputation and from 1992 to 1993 was the president of the Missouri Association of Trial Attorneys.

Selected publications

References

External links
 
 

1926 births
2018 deaths
Bryologists
20th-century American botanists
21st-century American botanists
Florida Southern College alumni
University of Tennessee alumni
Florida State University alumni
Missouri State University faculty
Fellows of the American Association for the Advancement of Science
Politicians from Springfield, Missouri